(1258 – after 1307) was a Japanese noblewoman, poet and author. She was a concubine of Emperor Go-Fukakusa from 1271 to 1283, and later became a Buddhist nun. After years of travelling, around 1304–07 she wrote a memoir, Towazugatari ("An Unasked-For Tale", commonly translated into English as The Confessions of Lady Nijō), the work for which she is known today, and which is also the only substantial source of information on her life.

Court life
Lady Nijō was a member of the Koga family, a branch of the Minamoto clan descended from Emperor Murakami through Prince Tomohira, his seventh son. The clan's station at court was established through the allegiance made by Tomohira's son, Minamoto no Morofusa, with Emperor Go-Sanjō. Lady Nijō's father and paternal grandfather held important positions at the imperial court, and many of her relatives and ancestors had high reputations for their literary abilities. Her real name does not survive. The name "Nijō" was given to her at the court: it was common practice at the time to designate court ladies by street names, and "Nijō" ("Second Avenue") designates a high rank. It indicates proximity to the First Ward, which is where the Imperial household was located.

According to the Towazugatari, Emperor Go-Fukakusa was in love with Nijō's mother, Sukedai. However, she died shortly after Nijō was born, and Go-Fukakusa turned his affections to Nijō. She was taken to the court at the age of four, and was subsequently raised there. In 1271, Nijō, aged 14, was given by her father to Go-Fukakusa as a concubine. It is unclear whether Nijō should be considered a formal wife (seisai) or a concubine (meshudo): there is evidence in the Confessions to support both interpretations.

Nijō's life at the court was plagued by numerous troubles. Her father died when she was 15 and it hampered her circumstance because there was no influential figure to advance her cause. Additionally, she was forced to have sexual relations against her will with court men, including Takatsukasa Kanehira.  Her relationship with the emperor also became strained from the beginning, because she took several other lovers over the years, including one whom she knew before becoming a concubine. Matters were complicated further by Nijō's pregnancies: the only child she bore to Go-Fukakusa died in infancy, and the other three children she had were not by the emperor. Go-Fukakusa's consort, Higashi-nijō, was greatly displeased with Nijō's behaviour and Go-Fukakusa's apparent affinity for the concubine. Ultimately, it was due to Higashi-nijō's request that Nijō was expelled from the court in 1283.

Religious life
Nijō's life after leaving the imperial court are revealed in Books 4 and 5 of Towazugatari. Like many women in Medieval Japan whose lives met with unfortunate circumstances, Nijō became a Buddhist nun. She traveled to saсred and historical places, following the footsteps of the famous poet and priest, Saigyō, returning to the capital regularly. Kimura Saeko notes that some of these visits never actually took place, meaning that sections of Nijō's travels are fictionalised. Book 4 begins in 1289, skipping several years (thus leading scholars to believe that some material may be missing); Book 5 skips some more years and describes Nijō's grief at Go-Fukakusa's death in 1304. Towazugatari ends in 1306, and nothing is known about what happened to Nijō afterwards or when she died.

Towazugatari
Towazugatari was written c. 1307 and covers events of the period from 1271 to 1306.The work is considered one of the greatest works of Japanese literature, as well being a rare account of events not typically recorded in premodern Japanese literary works, such as sexual coercion.

Nijō's autobiography did not enjoy wide circulation, potentially due to later factionalism that split the imperial family or the fact that Nijō's portrayal of Emperor Go-Fukakusa was both intimate and humanising. A single 17th-century copy was discovered among the holdings of the Imperial Household in 1940 by Yamagishi Tokuhei, with several gaps in Book 5, noted by the scribe. The book was published in 1950, with a complete annotated edition following in 1966. There are two English translations:

Karen Brazell. The Confessions of Lady Nijo. A Zenith book published by Arrow Books Ltd., London, 1973. 
Wilfrid Whitehouse and Eizo Yanagisawa. Lady Nijo's own story; Towazugatari: the candid diary of a thirteenth-century Japanese imperial concubine. Tuttle, Rutland, Vt. 1974.

Genealogy

Ancestors

Issue
Partners and their respective issue:
Emperor Go-Fukakusa (後深草天皇; 28 June 1243 – 17 August 1304)
First son (1273 – 1274)
Saionji Sanekane (西園寺 実兼; 1249 – 21 October 1322)
First daughter (1275 – ?)
Prince Shojo (d. 1281)
Second son (1281 – ?)
Third son (1282 – ?)

In contemporary culture
Lady Nijō appears as an important character in Act I of Caryl Churchill's play Top Girls.

References

Japanese concubines
People of Heian-period Japan
Japanese women writers
Japanese writers
1258 births
Date of death unknown
14th-century deaths
Japanese diarists
Japanese Buddhist nuns
13th-century Buddhist nuns
14th-century Buddhist nuns
Heian period Buddhist nuns
13th-century Japanese women writers
14th-century Japanese women writers